Mike Fokoroni (also written Mike Fokorani; born 5 July 1976) is a Zimbabwean long-distance runner. His personal best time for the marathon is 2:13:17 hours, achieved in August 2008, placing 11th at the Beijing Olympics. In June 2013 he finished 8th to receive a gold medal in the Comrades ultramarathon of 87 km.

Fokoroni won the 2016 Two Oceans Marathon.

Achievements

References

External links

1976 births
Living people
Zimbabwean male long-distance runners
Zimbabwean male marathon runners
Athletes (track and field) at the 2008 Summer Olympics
Olympic athletes of Zimbabwe
World Athletics Championships athletes for Zimbabwe